Dalcera is a genus of moths of the family Dalceridae with four Neotropical species. The larva of one species, D. abrasa, is a pest of coffee.

Species
Dalcera abrasa
Recorded food plants: Coffea, Eremanthus glomerulatus, Erythroxylum deciduum, Metrodorea pubescens, Ouratea hexasperma, Pouteria ramiflora, Qualea parviflora
Dalcera canescens
Dalcera haywardi
Dalcera semirufa

References

Dalcera at Tolweb
Dalcera at HOSTS

Dalceridae
Zygaenoidea genera